Group 1 Crew was an American Christian hip hop band signed to Fervent Records and Warner Bros. Records. They made their debut with the hit song "Can't Go On" on WOW Hits 2007. Soon after they released their first EP I have a dream (2006), the band released their self-titled full-length debut studio album, Group 1 Crew, in February 2007. Their song "Love is a Beautiful Thing" charted into the Top 20 in May 2007 on R&R magazine's Christian chart. The group's second studio album Ordinary Dreamers was released on September 16, 2008. Their popular radio single "Forgive Me" appeared on Season 5 Episode 2 of One Tree Hill, which premiered on January 8, 2008. In September 2010, they released the album Outta Space Love, which has proven to be their most mainstream effort, as many of the songs were used in the reality television show America's Got Talent. In 2017, it was announced that Manwell would be departing the group in order to pursue other interests.

Band members

Former
 Jose "Manwell" Reyes – vocals and rap (2003–2017)
 Sarah Sandoz - vocals and rap (2014–2017)
 Lance Herring - guitars (2014–2017)
 Loren "Snoopy" Clark - bass (2014–2017)
 Brian - drums (2014–2017)
 Pablo Villatoro – vocals & rap (2003–2017)
 Blanca Callahan – lead vocals (2003–2013, left due to pregnancy)
 Ben Callahan - percussion and background vocals (2006–2013)

Personal lives
On June 11, 2011, Manwell married comedian Anjelah Johnson in Half Moon Bay, California.

Discography

Albums

EPs

Singles

Compilation contributions

Album appearances of Blanca

Album appearances of Manwell

Awards and nominations

GMA Dove Awards
Group 1 Crew has been nominated for nine Dove Awards in its career, winning five of them so far.

References

External links
 
 On trusting God and being fearless: an interview - BibleDude.net

Christian hip hop groups
Fervent Records artists
American performers of Christian hip hop music
Musical groups established in 2003 
Musical groups disestablished in 2017
Word Records artists